Agmostigma is a small genus of hymenopteran insects of the family Eulophidae which contains three species, all described in 1996 by Ubaidillah and LaSalle and so far only recorded from Brunei in northern Borneo.

References

Key to Nearctic eulophid genera
Universal Chalcidoidea Database

Eulophidae